Ålstad is a village in Steigen, Nordland, Norway. It is located on the island of Engeløya.

See also 
 List of villages in Nordland

References 

Villages in Nordland